Red River Range is a 1938 "Three Mesquiteers" Western film starring John Wayne, Ray Corrigan, Max Terhune, and Polly Moran. Wayne played the lead in eight of the fifty-one movies in the popular series. The director was George Sherman.

Plot summary
The Cattlemen's Association has called in the Mesquiteers to find cattle rustlers. They get Tex Riley to pose as Stony so Stony can arrive posing as a wanted outlaw. This gets Stony into the gang of rustlers and he alerts Tucson and Lullaby as to the next raid. But Hartley is on hand and unknown to anyone is the rustler's boss and he joins the posse with a plan that will do away with the Mesquiteers.

Cast
 John Wayne as Stony Brooke
 Ray Corrigan as Tucson Smith
 Max Terhune as Lullaby Joslin
 Elmer as Elmer (Lullaby Joslin's Ventriliquist Dummy) (uncredited) 
 Polly Moran as Mrs. Maxwell
 Lorna Gray as Jane Mason
 Kirby Grant as Tex Reilly
 Sammy McKim as Tommy Jones
 William Royle as Payne
 Perry Ivins as Hartley
 Stanley Blystone as Randall
 Lenore Bushman as Evelyn Maxwell
 Burr Caruth as Pop Mason
 Roger Williams as Sheriff Wood
 Earl Askam as Henchman Morton
 Olin Francis as Henchman Kenton
 Chuck Baldra as Dude Ranch Cowhand (uncredited) 
 Ed Cassidy as Marshal (uncredited) 
 Bert Dillard as Cattleman (uncredited) 
 Jack Montgomery as Cattleman (uncredited) 
 Theodore Lorch as Rancher (uncredited) 
 Frank O'Connor as Photographer (uncredited)
 Curley Dresden as Rustler (uncredited)
 Robert McKenzie as Justice of the Peace (uncredited) 
 Joe Whitehead as Henchman (uncredited)
 Fred 'Snowflake' Toones as Bellhop (uncredited)
 Al Taylor as Slick (Henchman) (uncredited) 
 John Beach as Rustler (uncredited)

See also
 John Wayne filmography

References

External links
 
 
 
 

1938 films
American black-and-white films
1930s English-language films
Three Mesquiteers films
Films directed by George Sherman
1938 Western (genre) films
Republic Pictures films
American Western (genre) films
1930s American films